The 1988 Southwest Conference women's basketball tournament was held March 9–12, 1988, at Moody Coliseum in Dallas, Texas. 

Number 1 seed  defeated 3 seed  88-61 to win their 6th championship and receive the conference's automatic bid to the 1988 NCAA tournament.

Format and seeding 
The tournament consisted of a 6 team single-elimination tournament. The top two seeds had a bye to the Semifinals.

Tournament

References 

Southwest Conference women's Basketball Tournament
Basketball in Dallas
1988 in sports in Texas
1988 in American women's basketball